Belle Ville was a settlement of African Americans established in McIntosh County, Georgia during the Reconstruction Era after the U.S. Civil War. It was established by Tunis Campbell who bought 1,250 acres of land in the area after the war. As a justice of the peace, minister, and political boss, Campbell organized a black power structure in McIntosh County that protected freed people from white abuses, whether against their bodies or in labor negotiations. He headed a 300-strong African American militia that guarded him from reprisals by the Ku Klux Klan or others, even though his home was burned, he was poisoned, and his family lived in constant fear.

References

Unincorporated communities in McIntosh County, Georgia